Walthamstow College of Art was an art school based in Walthamstow, north-east London. In the 1970s, it was merged into North East London Polytechnic and is now part of the University of East London (UEL). UEL's School of Architecture and the Visual Arts, is based at its Docklands Campus.

In 2017, The William Morris Gallery hosted an exhibition, 'Be Magnificent', documenting some of its most famous alumni.

Notable alumni
  Vanilla Beer, artist
 Ian Dury, musician
 Marion Foale, fashion designer
 Peter Greenaway, film director, studied 1962-65
 John Lloyd (graphic designer)
 Ken Russell, film director
 Vivian Stanshall, musician
 Sally Tuffin, fashion designer and ceramicist
 Valerie Wiffen, painter

Notable staff
 Peter Blake, artist
 Daphne Brooker
 Margaret Green, painter

References

Art schools in London
Higher education colleges in London
London Borough of Waltham Forest
Education in the London Borough of Waltham Forest
Walthamstow